The Sydney College of the Arts (SCA) is a contemporary art school that was a faculty of the University of Sydney from 1990 until 2017, when it became a school of the Faculty of Arts and Social Sciences. Until the end of 2019, the campus was located in Rozelle, Sydney and housed within Callan Park in  the Kirkbride complex, a cluster of sandstone buildings designed by James Barnet, the government architect, in the late 19th century. SCA moved to the main Camperdown Campus of the University of Sydney in 2020 and now occupies a substantial portion of the Old Teachers' College.

History 
The first cohort of 240 students (120 design students and 120 visual arts) commenced studying at Sydney College of the Arts in 1977. The Visual Arts students were based in a Campus on Smith Street Balmain and the Design students in the old Lever and Kitchen building at White Bay. Over the next few years it grew quickly and expanded into further premises. Prior to 1995, the College of the Arts was located at Monteith, Glebe, and temporary buildings on Smith and Mansfield Streets, in Balmain. It moved to the Kirkbride complex in 1992, after considerable wrangling with several Vice-Chancellors of the University.

From its inception in 1974, SCA established itself as a leading institution in visual arts teaching, with an emphasis on conceptual approaches to art practice, playing a central role in the growth and acceptance of artistic postmodernism in Australia. it was originally established as an independent College of Advanced Education before becoming part of Sydney University in 1990. Often referred to as the "artist's art school", it has had a long tradition of nurturing diversity of practice and opinion, with a distinguished list of teachers and alumni. On the measure of the number of successful and prominent art practitioners it has educated, SCA is in a position to claim that it is the most successful art school in Australia.

On 21 June 2016 the University of Sydney announced that the school would be merged with UNSW Art & Design, a plan that was later abandoned. On 22 August 2016 students occupied the Executive Administration Offices of SCA in protest against the closure of the art school and the ensuing job losses, and the move of SCA from its current home in Rozelle. The occupation ended on 25 October, making it the longest running student occupation in the University of Sydney's history.

From 2017, SCA began the process of rewriting its curriculum to suit broader-scale learning. In transitioning from a faculty to a department within the Faculty of Arts and Social Sciences, it has made its courses available to more students, while its students can access other departments and disciplines. It moved from Kirkbride to a new purpose-designed facility in the historic Old Teacher's College on the main campus of the University in 2020, making it the only art school to be housed in such close proximity to other schools and facilities in any university in Australia.

Programs of study
 Ceramics – BVA, MFA, MCA, PhD
 Critical Studies – BVA, MFA, PhD
 Curating – MArtC, PhD
 Glass – BVA, MFA, MCA, PhD
 Jewellery and Object – BVA, MFA, MCA, PhD
 Painting – BVA, MFA, MCA, PhD
 Photomedia – BVA, MFA, MCA, PhD
 Printmedia – BVA, MFA, MCA, PhD
 Screen Arts – BVA, MFA, MMI, MCA, PhD
 Sculpture – BVA, MFA, MCA, PhD

Notable alumni

Notable current and past faculty

SCA Campus

References

External links

 Sydney College of the Arts website

Arts, College of the
Art schools in Australia
Rozelle, New South Wales
Educational institutions established in 1974
1974 establishments in Australia